South Central High School is a public high school in Greenwich Township, just north of the village limits of Greenwich, Ohio, United States.  It was created in 1960 with the consolidation of the Greenwich and North Fairfield school districts.  It is the only high school in the South Central Local Schools district.  Their mascot is the Trojans and they are members of the Firelands Conference.

References

External links
 

High schools in Huron County, Ohio
Public high schools in Ohio